Željko Pavlović (born 2 March 1971) is a retired Croatian football goalkeeper.

Club career
Pavlović started his professional career in 1989 at the club FK Željezničar from Bosnia and Herzegovina and transferred after three seasons to Croatian club Dinamo Zagreb, where he spent one season as understudy to Dražen Ladić and made three domestic league appearances before leaving the club for their city rivals NK Zagreb in the summer of 1994. He spent two seasons with Zagreb as the club's first-choice goalkeeper and then he moved abroad by signing with Austrian club FC Linz for the 1996–97 season. He subsequently continued to play for LASK Linz after FC Linz merged with the club in the summer of 1997.

At club level, Pavlović played for LASK Linz until the end of the 2000–01 season and then he left the club for RSC Anderlecht from Belgium. However, he never managed to establish himself as the first-choice goalkeeper in the Anderlecht team in both of the two seasons he spent there and returned to Austria by signing with Wüstenrot Salzburg in July 2003. He spent only one half-season with Salzburg and went on to play for FC Kärnten until the end of the 2003–04 season. In July 2004, Pavlović signed with Wacker Tirol and has been the club's first-choice goalkeeper ever since, making a total of 57 Bundesliga appearances until the end of the 2005–06 season.

International career
Pavlović made his debut for the Croatian national team playing as the team's substitute goalkeeper in the second half of their friendly match against Israel on 26 March 1996 in Varaždin. He subsequently had to wait for more than three years to win his second international cap for the team, playing all 90 minutes in a friendly match against France on 13 November 1999 at the Stade de France. In 2000, he made three appearances for Croatia in international friendlies before he went on to play the only competitive international match in his career, playing all 90 minutes against Scotland in the Croatian national team's second qualifying match for the 2002 World Cup on 11 October 2000 in Zagreb. He made his last appearance for the Croatian national team in their friendly match against Greece on 25 April 2001 in Varaždin. Pavlović won a total of seven international caps for Croatia.

References

External links
 

1971 births
Living people
Footballers from Sarajevo
Croats of Bosnia and Herzegovina
Association football goalkeepers
Yugoslav footballers
Croatian footballers
Croatia international footballers
FK Željezničar Sarajevo players
GNK Dinamo Zagreb players
NK Zagreb players
FC Linz players
LASK players
R.S.C. Anderlecht players
FC Kärnten players
FC Wacker Innsbruck (2002) players
NK Hrvatski Dragovoljac players
Yugoslav First League players
Croatian Football League players
Austrian Football Bundesliga players
Croatian expatriate footballers
Expatriate footballers in Austria
Croatian expatriate sportspeople in Austria
Expatriate footballers in Belgium
Croatian expatriate sportspeople in Belgium